Eduardo Rergis Pacheco (born 20 April 1956) is a Mexican former footballer and manager.

Career
Rergis played as a central defender for Club América, Atlante, Oaxtepec, Tampico Madero, Tigres UANL and Veracruz.

Rergis played for Mexico at the 1976 Summer Olympics in Montreal and won a gold medal in football at the 1975 Pan American Games. He also participated in the 1977 FIFA World Youth Championship in Tunisia.

After he retired from playing, Rergis became a football coach. He has managed Deportivo Irapuato, Correcaminos UAT and Veracruz. He also led the Mexico U-20 team at the 2003 FIFA U-20 World Cup. He was an interim manager for Santos Laguna in 2011.

Personal
Rergis's sons, Guillermo and Eduardo, are also Mexican former footballer.

References

External links
 
 
 
 

1956 births
Living people
Mexico international footballers
Mexico under-20 international footballers
Footballers from Veracruz
Footballers at the 1976 Summer Olympics
Olympic footballers of Mexico
Club América footballers
Atlante F.C. footballers
C.F. Oaxtepec footballers
Tigres UANL footballers
C.D. Veracruz footballers
Mexican football managers
C.D. Veracruz managers
Santos Laguna managers
Mexican footballers
Association football defenders
Pan American Games gold medalists for Mexico
Pan American Games medalists in football
Footballers at the 1975 Pan American Games
Medalists at the 1975 Pan American Games